The 1958–59 Mexican Segunda División was the ninth season of the Mexican Segunda División. The season started on 13 July 1958 and concluded on 8 March 1959. It was won by Tampico.

Changes 
 Celaya was promoted to Primera División.
 Tampico was relegated from Primera División.
 UNAM returned to competition after a year on hiatus. IPN was dissolved due to political and economic problems.
 Durango, Nuevo León, Poza Rica and San José de Toluca joined the league.

Teams

League table

Results

References 

1958–59 in Mexican football
Segunda División de México seasons